Thad Jones, Mel Lewis and UMO is a big band jazz recording by UMO (Finnish acronym for "New Music Orchestra") with guest bandleaders / performers Thad Jones and Mel Lewis.  It was recorded in Helsinki in 1977 and was nominated for a 1979 Grammy award in the "Best Jazz Instrumental Performance - Big Band" category.

Track listing
 "Groove Merchant" – 5:05
 "It Only Happens Every Time" – 5:48
 "Tip-Toe" – 6:37
 "The Great One" – 9:38
 "Kids Are Pretty People" – 6:02
 "Summary" – 5:54
 "Little Pixie" – 7:55
 "Only For Now" – 7:10

Personnel
 Thad Jones – flugelhorn
 Mel Lewis – drums
 Simo Salminen – trumpet
 Markku Johansson – trumpet
 Esko Heikkinen – trumpet
 Kaj Backlund – trumpet
 Juhani Aalto – trombone
 Mircea Stan – trombone
 Petri Juutilainen – trombone
 Tom Bildo – trombone
 Pekka Poyry – saxophone, flute
 Juhani Aaltonen – saxophone, flute, clarinet
 Eero Koivistoinen – saxophone
 Teemu Salminen – saxophone, flute, clarinet
 Pentti Lahti – saxophone, clarinet
 Esko Linnavalli – piano
 Otto Berger – guitar
 Pekka Sarmanto – bass
 Esko Rosnell – percussion

References 

The Thad Jones/Mel Lewis Orchestra albums
1978 albums